Your Children Placate You From Premature Graves is a 2006 album by The Legendary Pink Dots. It is the group's 25th anniversary album.

Track listing

Personnel
Edward Ka-Spel – voice, keyboards
The Silverman – keyboards, electronics
Martijn De Kleer – guitar, bass, drums
Niels van Hoorn – saxophone, flute
Raymond Steeg – production, mixing, mastering, engineer

References

2006 albums
The Legendary Pink Dots albums